Althea Currier was an American glamour model and actress, active throughout the 1960’s.

Early life
Currier was born in 1941 in Baileyville, Maine and moved to Southern California in the late 1950s. She was a model and actress, noted for her large-breasted figure, who appeared in a number of erotic nudie-cuties and sexploitation B grade films in the 1960s.

Career
After moving to Los Angeles, Currier worked as a dance instructor for Arthur Murray studios and became involved in the entertainment field. She appeared in a number of low-budget B-movies in the early 1960s, making her debut in Russ Meyer's Erotica (1961), reportedly chosen by him because of her large breasts. Currier appeared in several films by Meyer and Peter Perry, and worked with producers such as Dan Sonney and Harry Novak.

Currier became involved in glamour/nude modeling and appeared in many men's magazines of the time, including Mosaic, Modern Man, Adam, Scamp, All Man and Man's Life. She was also featured in Adam magazine's 1964 full-color calendar and wrote an advice column for the magazine entitled "Ask Althea" from 1964 to 1967.

In 1965, Currier worked as an exotic dancer in Chuck Landis' Largo Strip Club in Los Angeles. She retired from entertainment towards the end of the 1960s to raise a family.

Filmography
Erotica (1961)
Mr. Peter's Pets (1962)
Surftide 77 (1962)
Heavenly Bodies! (1963)
Knockers Up (1963)
The Naked Flame (1964)
Everybody Loves It (1964)
Kiss Me Quick! (1964)
Lorna (1964)
Sinderella and the Golden Bra (1964)
The Girls on F Street aka Maidens of Fetish Street (1966)

Select magazine photo layouts
Scamp               (1961) Vol. 5, No. 3
Adam                (1962) Vol. 6, No. 6
Sir Knight          (1962) Vol. 3, No. 2
Mosaic              (1962) No. 4
RizKay              (1962) No. 1
Modern Man          (1963) November
Adam                (1963) Vol. 7, No. 11
Modern Man Annual   (1963) Winter
French Follies      (1964) Vol. 2, No. 1
Adam                (1964) Vol. 8, No. 6
Adam                (1965) Vol. 9, No. 6
Modern Man Deluxe   (1966) Vol. 38
Beau                (1967) Vol. 3, No. 14
All Man             (1967) Vol. 8, No. 2
Man's Life          (1970) Vol. 14, No. 1
Candid              (Unknown Year) Vol. 78, No. 7

References

Further reading

External links

American female adult models
American film actresses
1941 births
Living people
20th-century American actresses
People from Washington County, Maine
Actresses from Maine
American female erotic dancers
American erotic dancers
Dancers from Maine
21st-century American women